Live in Athens may refer to:

Live in Athens (Fates Warning video album), 2005
"Live in Athens" (Motörhead single), 1988
Live In Athens 1987, 2013 video album by Peter Gabriel
Live In Athens, 2011 DVD by Archive
With the Wild Crowd! Live in Athens, GA, 2012 live album and DVD by The B-52s